Eliza "Virginia" Capers (September 22, 1925 – May 6, 2004) was an American actress. She won the Tony Award for Best Lead Actress in a Musical in 1974 for her performance as Lena Younger in Raisin, a musical version of Lorraine Hansberry's play A Raisin in the Sun.

Career 
She made her Broadway debut in the musical Jamaica in 1957 as a replacement for Adelaide Hall in the role of Grandma Obeah, taking over the role when Hall left the musical. Capers went on to appear in Saratoga and Raisin.

Capers was a familiar face to television audiences. In addition to a recurring role on The Fresh Prince of Bel-Air as Hattie Banks, she appeared in many television shows, including Have Gun Will Travel, Dragnet,  Marcus Welby, M.D., My Three Sons, Mannix, The Waltons, Mork & Mindy, Highway to Heaven, St. Elsewhere, Murder, She Wrote, Evening Shade, The Golden Girls, Unsub, Booker, Married... with Children, The Practice and ER.

Capers appeared in such films as Norwood (1970), The Great White Hope (1970), Lady Sings the Blues (1972), The North Avenue Irregulars (1979), The Toy (1982), Teachers (1984), Howard the Duck (1986), Ferris Bueller's Day Off (1986), Beethoven's 2nd (1993) and What's Love Got to Do with It (1993).

Capers founded the Lafayette Players, a Los Angeles repertory theatre company for African-American performers. She was the recipient of the National Black Theatre Festival Living Legend Award, the Paul Robeson Pioneer Award, and the NAACP Image Award for theatre excellence.

Capers provided the narration for the 1993 adventure game Gabriel Knight: Sins of the Fathers. For her performance, she won Computer Gaming Worlds award for Best Female Voice-Over Acting; the editors had expected to give the award to someone portraying a specific character but were "totally overwhelmed" by Capers as the narrator, stating that "Her performance alone makes it worthwhile to purchase the CD version" (as voice acting is absent from some versions of the game).

Death 
Capers died on May 6, 2004, of complications from pneumonia in Los Angeles, California, aged 78.

Filmography

Film and television

Video games

References

External links 
 
 

1925 births
2004 deaths
Tony Award winners
Actresses from South Carolina
People from Sumter, South Carolina
Howard University alumni
Juilliard School alumni
Deaths from pneumonia in California
20th-century American actresses
21st-century American actresses
African-American actresses
American television actresses
American film actresses
American musical theatre actresses
20th-century African-American women singers
American stage actresses
20th-century American singers
20th-century American women singers
21st-century African-American women
21st-century African-American people